Meri Behan Meri Dewrani or Meri Behan Meri Devrani (English: My sister, my sister in law) is a Pakistani television serial first aired on 1 May 2012 at ARY Digital. Serial is directed by Aamir Khattak and written by Muhammad Asif. Serial stars Sangeeta, Shehryar Zaidi, Qavi Khan, Noman Masood, Seemi Pasha, Badar Khalil, Hassan Niazi, Madiha Iftikhar, Sherry Shah and Beenish Chohan.

Cast 
 Sangeeta
 Shehryar Zaidi
 Qavi Khan
 Noman Masood
 Seemi Pasha
 Badar Khalil
 Hassan Niazi
 Madiha Iftikhar
 Beenish Chohan
 Hannan Sameed
 Sherry Shah
 Sumbul Shahid
 Zeba Ali
 Soniya Hussain
 Tipu Sharif

References

External links 
 
 

ARY Digital original programming
Urdu-language television shows
Pakistani drama television series
2012 Pakistani television series debuts